Stephone Paige (born October 15, 1961), is a former professional American football player who played for the Kansas City Chiefs from 1983 to 1992. A 6'2" 185 lb. wide receiver undrafted free agent from California State University, Fresno, Paige played 9 years for the Chiefs and his final year with the Minnesota Vikings in 1993. His best year as a professional came during the 1990 season when he caught 65 receptions for 1,021 yards. He is the uncle of NBA player Shabazz Muhammad and tennis player Asia Muhammad

On  December 22, 1985, Paige had 309 yards receiving yards versus the San Diego Chargers, an NFL record until it was broken in 1989 by Flipper Anderson of the Los Angeles Rams with 336 yards. 

Between 1985 and 1991, Paige had at least one reception for 83 consecutive games, a team record until it was broken on January 1, 2006 by tight end Tony Gonzalez.

Paige is married to wife Paula and has three children; son, Stephone II; son, Élon; daughter, Brieon. Stephone Paige's sister Faye Mohammad was a basketball player and track athlete at Long Beach State.

References

External links
Stephone Paige player profile

American football wide receivers
Saddleback Gauchos football players
Fresno State Bulldogs football players
Kansas City Chiefs players
Living people
1961 births
People from Slidell, Louisiana
Long Beach Polytechnic High School alumni